"The Greatest Mistakes" is a song by Australian alternative rock band Birds of Tokyo and is the third single from their sixth studio album, Human Design. It was released on 16 August 2019.

Band member Ian Kenny said "The Greatest Mistakes" is cut from the same cloth as "Good Lord" saying "It's actually inspired by the same personal experience... but it's got the perspective of thankfully being a bit further down the road."

Charts

References

2019 songs
2019 singles
Birds of Tokyo songs
EMI Records singles